John Alan Luginbill (born November 13, 1946) is a former American football coach.

College coaching career
Luginbill began his college coaching career at Pasadena City College, where he served as an assistant from 1968 to 1971 and returned from 1974 to 1976. In 1977 Luginbill was promoted to head coach and guided PCC to a Jr. Rose Bowl Championship, National Championship and finished the regular season with a record of 11–1.

Luginbill got his Division I college break with the Arizona State Sun Devils. He worked at ASU for two years as assistant coach. After a one-year stint with the University of Wyoming, he returned to Arizona State. Luginbill remained as a coach at ASU until 1984, when he left to enter the athletic administration at San Diego State University.

After spending three years on the administrative side, Luginbill was given control of a slumping Aztec program. Three years later, Luginbill's Aztecs went 8–4–1, including a 52-all tie with BYU before 56,737 at Jack Murphy Stadium. While at SDSU, Luginbill recruited running back Marshall Faulk. Luginbill served as head coach of the Aztecs for five years, where he earned an overall record of 31–25–3. In those five years, he never suffered a losing season.

Luginbill is currently Director of Player Personnel at Arizona State University.

Professional coaching career
Luginbill served as the inaugural head coach for the Amsterdam Admirals of NFL Europe from 1995 to 2000. He led the Admirals to a 34–26 record. Amsterdam went 9–1 in 1995 and played in the World Bowl.

After coaching in Europe, Luginbill returned to the States to serve as the head coach and director of football operations for the XFL’s Los Angeles Xtreme. In the league’s first and only year, he guided the Xtreme to a championship.

Luginbill served as head coach and general manager for the Detroit Fury of the Arena Football League in 2003.

Personal
Luginbill and his wife, Susan, are the parents of twins, a daughter, Kerry, and a son, Tom, who is a college football analyst for ESPN.

Head coaching record

College

NFL Europe

XFL

Arena Football League

References

External links
 Arena Football coaching record

1946 births
Living people
American football halfbacks
Amsterdam Admirals coaches
Arizona State Sun Devils football coaches
Cal Poly Pomona Broncos football players
Detroit Fury coaches
San Diego State Aztecs football coaches
Wyoming Cowboys football coaches
Los Angeles Xtreme coaches
Pasadena City Lancers football coaches
Sportspeople from Pomona, California